Napho may refer to:

 Bia (butterfly), a Neotropical genus of butterflies, also known as Napho
 Bia actorion (Napho actoriaena), a species 
 Ban Napho, village in Sainyabuli Province, Laos
 Na Pho District in Buriram Province, Thailand

See also 
 Nafo
 Napo (disambiguation)